
Etang Grenon or Lac Grenon is a lake at Montana in the canton of Valais, Switzerland. Located at an elevation of 1497 m, its surface area is 3.5 ha.

Grenon